The Long Harlequin is a two-cylinder horizontally opposed aircraft engine.

Design and development

The Harlequin engine was developed as a replacement to the Heath-Henderson B-4 engine used on the Long Henderson Longster homebuilt aircraft. The cylinders were based on a 74 cubic inch Harley Davidson Engine with connecting rods from Continental built Star Marine engine. The builder was expected to forge their own crankcase and crankshaft.

Applications
Long Longster

Engines on display
Eagles Mere Aircraft Museum 
Dart Airport Museum in Mayville NY

Specifications (Long Herlequin)

References

1930s aircraft piston engines